Florida Mayhem is an American professional Overwatch esports team based in Miami and Orlando, Florida. The team competes in the Overwatch League (OWL) as a member of the league's West Division. Founded in 2017, Florida Mayhem is one of the league's twelve founding members and is owned and operated by Florida-based esports organization Misfits Gaming and CEO Ben Spoont. The organization also ran Mayhem Academy, an academy team for the Mayhem that competed in Overwatch Contenders. The Mayhem made their first season playoffs appearance in franchise history in the 2020 season.

Franchise history

Team creation: 2016–2017 
The team that would become the Florida Mayhem was formed in June 2016 as the first foray into Overwatch for Misfits Gaming, after Misfits picked up the European team Graviton Surge. The original roster included Sebastian "Zebbosai" Olsson, who would play in the inaugural season of the Overwatch League as the main support player for the Mayhem.

On July 12, 2017, Overwatch developer Activision Blizzard officially announced that Misfits, which is partially owned by the NBA team Miami Heat, had acquired an Overwatch League franchise for the Miami–Orlando area. On November 2, the organization revealed that the franchise would be named the Florida Mayhem and announced the transfer of the existing Misfits Overwatch roster to the Mayhem. With no further roster moves, the Mayhem headed into the inaugural Overwatch League season with only six players, the minimum required for the Overwatch League and the fewest players among the 12 inaugural season teams.

Early years: 2018–present 
On January 11, 2018, the Mayhem played their first Overwatch League match, a 1–3 loss to the London Spitfire. The following week, on January 19, they notched their first-ever victory after defeating the Shanghai Dragons 4–0; this would be their only win during Stage 1 of the season. On May 2, head coach Vytis "Mineral" Lasaitis temporarily stepped down from his position, citing that he had been experiencing "various health issues" and burnout since stage two. Assistant coach Choi "r2der" Hyun-jin and analyst Albert Yeh lead the team in his absence until his return at the beginning of Stage 4. The team ended the 2018 regular season with a  record, second-to-last in the League (ahead of only the winless Dragons).

The Mayhem were not able to find much more success in their 2019 season. After finishing Stage 1 with only one win, the Mayhem announced their intention to implement an all-Korean team and fired two coaches, including head coach Mineral.  The team's struggles continued in Stage 2, as they did not win a single match. Prior to Stage 3, the Mayhem's all-Korean overhaul continued, as they made several roster changes. Florida hired Oh "Unread" Nam-hun amidst a one-win Stage 3 as the team's new head coach. The Mayhem found success in Stage 4, when the league implemented a 2-2-2 role lock, as they were able to win four of their final five matches.

For their 2020 season, the Mayhem debuted new colors, trading the yellow and red color scheme that the team had used for two years in favor of a 1980s Miami color scheme, featuring pink, teal, and black. The Mayhem opened the season going 7–4 heading into the May Melee tournament, where they reached the finals before being defeated by the San Francisco Shock. Florida finished the season with 14 wins, 3 bonus wins from midseason tournaments, and 7 losses to claim the fourth seed in the North America season playoffs. A 0–3 loss to the Washington Justice on September 12 eliminated the Mayhem from the North America bracket.

The Mayhem's 2021 season began on April 17, 2021, against the Atlanta Reign in the May Melee qualifiers; they won their opener 1–3. Florida won three of their four qualifier matches and advanced to the regional knockouts. After defeating the Toronto Defiant and the Washington Justice in the regional knockouts, the Mayhem advanced to the interregional tournament bracket. In the first match in the double-elimination tournament, the Mayhem lost to the Shanghai Dragons, sending them to the lower bracket of the tournament. In the first round of the lower bracket, Florida defeated the Chengdu Hunters, but they lost, again, to the Dragons in the following round, eliminating them from the tournament. After the strong start to the season, Florida struggled to continue their success. Florida won only two more games in the season, finishing with a 5–11 record and did not qualify for the season playoffs.

Team identity 
The Mayhem's branding was officially unveiled on November 2, 2017. The team's logo features the letter M inscribed in a bomb (representing competitive impact) with a palm tree-shaped fuse (representing Florida). The team colors were originally red, to pay homage to the original Misfits team; yellow, to represent Florida, the "Sunshine State;" and black, tying in with the Miami Heat. Prior to the 2020 season, the colors were changed to black, pink, and teal, similar to the Miami Vice-inspired alternate jerseys that were used in the 2019 season.

Personnel

Current roster

Head coaches

Awards and records

Seasons overview

Individual accomplishments 

All-Star Game selections
Sayaplayer (Ha Jeong-woo) – 2018, 2019
Yaki (Kim Jun-ki) – 2020

All-Star Game head coaches
KuKi (Kim Dae-kuk) – 2020

Academy team

On February 22, 2018, the Mayhem formally announced their academy team for Overwatch Contenders North America would be called "Mayhem Academy" (MA). In 2019 Season One, Mayhem Academy became the first team ever to defeat Fusion University, which had never lost a regular season or playoff match in three seasons of play. Mayhem Academy temporarily ceased play following 2019 Season One to "retool" the team as a whole. Many of the former MA players formed Revival, a team that competed in 2019 Season Two.

Seasons overview

References

External links 

 

 
2017 establishments in Florida
Esports teams based in the United States
Esports teams established in 2017
Overwatch League teams
Sports teams in Miami